The Dabikinė  is a river of  Akmenė district municipality, Šiauliai County, northern Lithuania. It flows for 37.2 kilometres and has a basin area of 387.6 km2.

References

Rivers of Lithuania
Akmenė District Municipality
Venta River basin
Rivers of Latvia